Samuel D. Ratcliffe (born 1945, died 1995 in New York City) was an American screenwriter for daytime television.

He grew up in Birmingham, Alabama and graduated from Birmingham Southern College, moving to New York in 1968 to pursue a career as an actor. From 1968 until the mid-seventies, he appeared in commercials, films and theatre. He was Matt in the long-running off-Broadway play, The Fantasticks and starred in the Broadway musical, Hurry Harry.

In 1976 he began to write for daytime television dramas. He won numerous awards, including a Daytime Emmy in 1991 for his work as head writer for NBC Daytime's Santa Barbara. He also served as Head Writer for NBC's Texas and Another World.

Awards and nominations
Daytime Emmy Awards

WINS
(1991; Best Writing; Santa Barbara)

NOMINATIONS 
(1985; Best Writing; Guiding Light)
(1985, 1994 & 1996; Best Writing; Another World)

Writers Guild of America Award

WINS
(1991 & 1992 seasons; Santa Barbara)

NOMINATIONS 
(1985 season; Guiding Light)
(1993 season; Santa Barbara)
(1994, 1995 & 1996 seasons; Another World)

Head writing tenure

External links

References

American soap opera writers
American male screenwriters
1945 births
1995 deaths
Daytime Emmy Award winners
Writers Guild of America Award winners
American male television writers
20th-century American male writers
20th-century American screenwriters